Loscopia velata, the veiled ear moth, is a species of cutworm or dart moth in the family Noctuidae.

The MONA or Hodges number for Loscopia velata is 9454.

References

Further reading

External links

 

Noctuinae
Articles created by Qbugbot
Moths described in 1865